The National Film Award for Best Feature Film in Telugu is one of the National Film Awards presented annually by the Directorate of Film Festivals, the organisation set up by Ministry of Information and Broadcasting, India. It is one of several awards presented for feature films and awarded with Rajat Kamal (Silver Lotus).

The National Film Awards, established in 1954, are the most prominent film awards in India that merit the best of the Indian cinema. The ceremony also presents awards for films in various regional languages.

Awards for films in seven regional language (Bengali, Hindi, Kannada, Malayalam, Marathi, Tamil and Telugu) started from 2nd National Film Awards which were presented on 21 December 1955. Three awards of "President's Silver Medal for Best Feature Film", "Certificate of Merit for the Second Best Feature Film" and "Certificate of Merit for the Third Best Feature Film" were instituted. The later two certificate awards were discontinued from 15th National Film Awards (1967).

The 1954 film, directed by K. V. Reddy, Peddamanushulu was honoured with the first president's silver medal for Best Feature Film in Telugu. Certificate of Merit for Second and Third Best Feature Films in Telugu were received by Thodu Dongalu and Vipra Narayana respectively.

Winners 

Award includes 'Rajat Kamal' (Silver Lotus Award) and cash prize. Following are the award winners over the years:

References

External links 
 Official Page for Directorate of Film Festivals, India
 National Film Awards Archives

Telugu
Telugu cinema